Albany Center Gallery is a nonprofit art space located in downtown Albany, New York. Supported by city, state, corporate and foundation funds, as well as fundraisers, individual donations and memberships, the Gallery is dedicated to the exhibition of regional artists within a 100-mile radius of Albany, and building a strong, knowledgeable audience for the visual arts. Serving the art community and the general public, all of Albany Center Gallery's exhibitions, receptions, and artist interviews are free and open to the public. The gallery presents at least seven major exhibitions a year in the main gallery, including the Mohawk Hudson Regional Invitational, an annual exhibition featuring selected artists from the previous year's Artists of the Mohawk-Hudson Region exhibit.

History
Founded in 1977 by Leslie Urbach, Albany Center Gallery has exhibited thousands of the area's finest contemporary artists working in the following media: painting, drawing, sculpture, photography, printmaking, fiber arts, digital art, video, mixed media, artist books, and installation. Notable exhibitors over the years include Leigh Wen, Scott Nelson Foster, T.E. Breitenbach, Jenny Kemp, Ed Cowley, Thom O’Connor, Richard Garrison, Scott Brodie, Betty Warren, Willie Marlowe, William Jaeger, and Erik Laffer.

The Capital Region's Times Union named Albany Center Gallery the best art gallery of 2012, also receiving the same honor in the 2015 Metroland Readers Poll.

See also 
Culture in New York's Capital District
List of museums in New York
Albany's Culture

References

External links 

 

Arts centers in New York (state)
Contemporary art galleries in the United States
Art galleries established in 1977
Art museums and galleries in New York (state)
Museums in Albany, New York
1977 establishments in New York (state)